Chris Phelan (born 12 December 1955) is an Australian former rugby league footballer who played in the 1980s. He was a state representative versatile forward for Queensland and a two-time New South Wales Rugby League premiership-winner with the Parramatta Eels.

Phelan was born in Ireland. Immensely strong for his size, the Townsville forward was playing for Brisbane's Southern Suburbs club when he was first selected for Queensland at lock in all three games of the 1981 interstate series. Phelan was the Brisbane Rugby League premierships Rothmans Medal winner that year and also won the Grand Final with Souths.

Phelan signed to Sydney's defending premiers Parramatta in 1982. He had to sit out the start of the 1982 while Parramatta waged a battle with the Queensland Rugby League over his transfer fee.

He played at prop in the Eels' two Grand Final wins over Manly in 1982 and 1983 but moved to the second-row for the 6-4 loss in the 1984 decider against Canterbury. In 1984 he was recalled to the Queensland side for game III of the State of Origin series where he appeared at second-row.

After a season with Oldham in England, Phelan returned to his home state in 1985 and continued playing with Souths, helping them to victory in the 1985 Brisbane Rugby League grand final.

In 2008 he was named in the Souths Magpies team of the century.

References

1955 births
Living people
Australian rugby league players
Oldham R.L.F.C. players
Parramatta Eels players
Queensland Rugby League State of Origin players
Rugby league players from County Laois
Rugby league props
Souths Logan Magpies players